Valeria Raquel Mazza (born 17 February 1972) is an Argentine supermodel and businesswoman of Italian ancestry. Mazza rose to prominence in the 1990s and became a household name after appearing on the cover of the Sports Illustrated Swimsuit Issue of 1996 alongside Tyra Banks. Mazza worked for fashion designers such as Gianni Versace and Roberto Cavalli.

Biography

Mazza was born in Rosario, Santa Fe Province to Raúl Mariano Mazza Ceriani and Monica Ferreira, and was raised in Paraná, Entre Ríos Province. A model since age 14, Mazza has also worked as an actress, presenter and brand ambassador. As a businesswoman, she has released three perfumes, her own magazine, and created an eyewear company and production company. Once a student of occupational therapy, she also promotes humanitarian causes, and is noted for her work with the Special Olympics, UNICEF, and the Pediatrics Unit of the Austral Hospital in Pilar, Buenos Aires Province.

Mazza remains a leading figure in Latin American fashion, and is considered the most important fashion model in Argentine history.

Personal life
On 9 May 1998, Mazza married businessman Alejandro Gravier in the Basilica of the Blessed Sacrament in Retiro, Buenos Aires; the wedding reception was held at the Hipodromo Argentino de Palermo with 1,500 guests. The couple has four children: Balthazar (b. 1999), Tiziano (b. 2002), Benicio (b. 2005), and Taína (b. 2008). They reside in Buenos Aires. The couple owns Finca Valeria, a countryside vacation property in La Barra, near Punta del Este, Uruguay, where they hold an important party with renowned guests every summer. In 2008, she and her husband were under investigation by Argentina's Revenue Service, AFIP, for alleged tax evasion to the tune of two million US dollars.

In addition to her native Spanish, Mazza also speaks Italian and English.

References

External links

Official website

1972 births
Living people
Argentine people of Italian descent
People from Paraná, Entre Ríos
People from Rosario, Santa Fe
Argentine female models
21st-century Argentine women